Ipswich School of Art (ISA) was an art school in Ipswich, Suffolk. It was founded as the Ipswich School of Science and Art which opened on 10 January 1859. It continued to have an independent existence until 1997, when it was absorbed by the University of Suffolk.

The ISA was founded on the initiative of the Science and Art Department, a subdivision of the Board of Trade

Notable alumni
 Margaret Tempest, illustrator and author
 Thomas Wilkinson, sculptor
 Brian Eno, musician

References

Ipswich
Art schools in England